Fawzi Franso Toma Hariri (born 1958 in Arbil, Iraq) is an Assyrian politician and former Iraq Minister of Industry.

Despite inaccurately being labeled as Kurdish throughout different media reports, Hariri is of Assyrian origin and son of the politician Franso Hariri (1937–2001). For 24 years, Fawzi lived in London where he was active in Assyrian, Kurdish, and Iraqi politics. He is a founding member of BNDP - Iraq, and a former member of the Assyrian National Congress (ANC) and the Assyrian Universal Alliance (AUA).

He was appointed Iraq's Minister of Industry and served from 2006-2010, after being elected in the December 2005 elections as a member of the Democratic Patriotic Alliance of Kurdistan. Prior to that, he was a Senior Diplomat and Chief of Staff of Iraq's Ministry of Foreign Affairs (2003-2005). 

An attempt on his life in October 2006 killed three bodyguards and injured 11 others, though Mr. Hariri was not in the traveling convoy at the time of the explosions. The attack in Baghdad occurred in the Assyrian Quarter of Dora, where twin car bombs went off within minutes.

References

Iraqi Assyrian politicians
Members of the Council of Representatives of Iraq
People from Erbil
Kurdistan Democratic Party politicians
Living people
Iraqi Christians
1958 births